Hans Steinbrenner (25 March 1928 - 18 June 2008) was a German painter and sculptor, who was born and died in Frankfurt am Main

References

20th-century German painters
20th-century German sculptors
20th-century German male artists
Artists from Frankfurt
1928 births
2008 deaths